Abdullah Bridge is a concrete bridge located in the city of Srinagar in the Indian union territory of Jammu and Kashmir. It is a relatively new bridge replacing the nearby Zero Bridge to connect  Sonwar Bagh and Rajbagh. It is named after Sheikh Mohammad Abdullah, a prominent politician from Kashmir. Its constructed by deptt of JKPCC under supervision of Er Mohammed Amin Shah

See also
Zero Bridge

References 

Bridges in Srinagar
Buildings and structures in Srinagar
Bridges over the Jhelum River
Bridges in Jammu and Kashmir
Bridges completed in the 20th century
Concrete bridges
Transport in Srinagar
20th-century architecture in India